The Coffey School of Aeronautics was a flight school at Harlem Airport in Oak Lawn, Illinois, founded by Cornelius Coffey and Willa Brown. It was the first flight school owned and operated by African-Americans in the United States. The school opened in 1940 and closed after World War II. While it was open, it trained African-American pilots as part of the Civilian Pilot Training Program; many of these pilots went on to join the Tuskegee Airmen.

References 

Aviation schools in the United States
Oak Lawn, Illinois